The List of National Historic Landmarks in North Dakota contains the landmarks designated by the U.S. Federal Government for the U.S. state of North Dakota.
There are 7 National Historic Landmarks (NHLs) in North Dakota.

Current National Historic Landmarks

|}

See also
National Register of Historic Places listings in North Dakota
List of National Historic Landmarks by state

References

History of North Dakota
National Historic Landmarks
North Dakota
 
National Historic Landmarks